Haripada Bandwala is a 2016 Indian Bengali language romantic comedy film directed by Pathikrit Basu and produced by Shrikant Mohta and Mahendra Soni under the banner of Shree Venkatesh Films. The film stars Ankush Hazra and Nusrat Jahan in lead roles. The songs are choreographed by Baba Yadav and Adil Shaikh.

It is a remake of 2014 Punjabi comedy film Disco Singh, which itself was loosely based on the 2009 Bollywood film Do Knot Disturb which in turn was a remake of the 2006 French film The Valet (French: La Doublure). The film was not successful at the box office.

Plot

Haripada Poddar is an inspiring band musician who dreams of making a video album with his dream model and actress Sweety. But he fed up of his fate that only one CD of his audio album was sold which resulted in huge loss and he was deeply indebted. Although he repeatedly addresses him as a 'world-famous celebrity Haripada Bandwala'.

Nandalal a fierce don of the society (although comical in his attitude), along with his assistants- Sona and Mona goes to kill Sukhendu Talapatra, a rich industrialist for some case of taking money from him. Nadalal orders Sona and Mona to throw the corpse in Ganga, although he knew they were very forgetful. Nandalal is very fearful of his wife Madhobi and goes to buy eatables and a gift for her wife as she ordered him. While returning home Nandalal notices a hoarding of Sweety posing for an advertisement of a soap, and falls for her. He thinks of bringing Sweety in a marriage party of his friend producer Dilip Da, by paying all the monetary charges.

Haripada is confronted over the phone for dues he took for loan, for the CD album, but unable to pay due to loss, just then he is informed to play his band at a wedding party. He finds Sweety there but can't have the chance to meet her because Nandalal who was present there was talking with her. A photographer sees the moment and takes snaps of Nandalal and Sweety talking but Haripada's photo came in between them when he was trying to meet Sweety. While returning home Haripada saves a girl named Sonia (Swastika Dutta) from some local goons and Sonia started liking him.

The photo was printed in news next day which is happened to be seen by Madhobi and she was furious by the news because it is rumored that Nandal and Sweety has an affair. Also, his father in law Dadoo (means Daddy) sees the news and calls him over the phone about what he is doing each and every time. To tackle the situation, Nandalal said his wife that, Sweety was talking to him along with her boyfriend (the photo of Haripada) for some matter. Although Madhobi not satisfactory, calls Gublu who calls himself 'James Bond, Bangla Version' her brother who is a detective to find out who is the boy in the photograph in the newspaper, whether he is with Sweety or not. Nandalal, also to fool the detective calls Haripada to act be with Sweety and also threatens Sweety for the same as to act like 'girlfriend-boyfriend'. He first tells Haripada to be with Sweety every time but cannot touch her, with four feet distance to maintain from her. But due to the detective's repeated observations on the two, Nandalal allows him to touch Sweety but no to go further than that. Again when the detective says that love without kissing is not love, Nandalal says to him to kiss her just like a sister. Sweety discovers Nandalal's instruction to Haripada and misunderstands Hari, thinking Hari would obey Nandalal. Instead, Haripada respects her showing his collections related to Sweety which makes Sweety likes him. Hari gifts her a sari in her birthday.
Now Sonia started loving Haripada because he saves her from the goons many times, even once she provoked them, just to see whether Hari saves her.

Also Madhobi falls in love for Haripada seeing his pictures all over in her rooms snapped by Gublu. But Haripada actually loves Sweety when she proposes him. But Nandalal tangles Haripada in trouble by giving a gun to touch for his fingerprints and makes Sweety say that she acted and lied that she loved him, rather she is Nandalal's girlfriend. Hari is left heartbroken.

Problem arises when Talapatra's dead body is found in Ganga and Sona and Mona forget that they themselves have thrown it in the river, calls police. The Police inspector searches his house and Haripada is accused of murdering Talapatra, and imprisons him.

Now, Both Sweety and Sonia along with Madhobi in love for Haripada Bandwala, goes to release him from jail; it is revealed to Haripada that Madhobi is Nandalal's wife and Sonia is Nandalal's daughter.
More comical events occur, when Nandalal arrives at that point to kill Haripada as his wife, daughter and his girlfriend all are in love for Haripada, a cheap band musician. At one juncture Dadoo arrives from Dubai, who is a greater don and actually made Nandalal a don of Kolkata.

He becomes soft after learning that Haripada Bandwala is an artist whose CD album he bought—the one person who bought his CD—and he listens to it every day. Nandalal is frustrated as his plan for harassing Haripada fails, and Dadoo promises him to help Haripada make a video album along with Hari's dream star Sweety.

Cast
 Ankush Hazra as Haripada Bandwala, a band musician
 Nusrat Jahan as Sweety
 Kharaj Mukherjee as Nandalal
 Biswanath Basu as Mona
 Kanchan Mullick as Gublu who calls himself James Bond Bangla Version
 Biswajit Chakraborty as Sukhendu Talapatra, a rich industrialist
 Supriyo Dutta as Police Inspector
 Pradip Dhar as Sona
 Laboni Sarkar as Madhobi (Nandalal's wife)
 Swastika Dutta as Sonia
 Arindam Sil in a (special appearance)
 Rajatava Dutta as Dadoo, father-in-law of Nandalal (special appearance)

Soundtrack

The soundtrack album consisting of 5 original songs and 1 remix version is composed by Indraadip Dasgupta. All the lyrics are penned by Prasen. The music is distributed by Shree Venkatesh Films.

References

External links
 

Indian romantic comedy films
Bengali remakes of Punjabi films
Indian remakes of French films
Bengali-language Indian films
2010s Bengali-language films
2016 films
Films scored by Indradeep Dasgupta
2016 romantic comedy films